Sean Robert Doolittle (born September 26, 1986) is an American professional baseball pitcher in the Washington Nationals organization. He has played in Major League Baseball (MLB) for the Oakland Athletics, Cincinnati Reds, Seattle Mariners and Nationals. He won the 2019 World Series with the Nationals, earning a save in game one.

The Athletics selected Doolittle in the first round in the 2007 MLB draft, as a first baseman and outfielder. He made his MLB debut in 2012 as a pitcher. He was an All-Star in 2014 and 2018.

Early life
Doolittle grew up in Tabernacle Township, New Jersey. He lived close to the baseball field and often went there to practice. He played Babe Ruth Baseball as a pitcher.

Doolittle attended Shawnee High School in Medford, New Jersey, where he was a stand-out pitcher. Doolittle led Shawnee to a state championship. Doolittle played for the University of Virginia as both a starting pitcher and first baseman. He formerly held the record for wins in a career for a Virginia pitcher — 22 — which has since been passed by Danny Hultzen. In 2005, he played collegiate summer baseball with the Harwich Mariners of the Cape Cod Baseball League. In 2005 and 2006, Doolittle was named to the USA National (Collegiate) Baseball Team.

Minor-league career

The Oakland Athletics selected Doolittle in the first round, with the 41st overall selection, in the 2007 Major League Baseball draft, as a first baseman and outfielder. He made his professional debut on June 18, 2007, and was expected to make his major league debut in 2009.

Despite being injured for most of the 2009 season, Doolittle was ranked tenth in Oakland's farm system  according to Baseball America. Doolittle missed the entire 2010 season while rehabbing from two knee surgeries. In the 2011 offseason, he was placed on Oakland's 40-man roster to be protected from the Rule 5 draft. After missing more than two years, Doolittle converted back to pitching, making his professional pitching debut in the instructional league in Arizona in 2011.

Major-league career

Oakland Athletics
After pitching just 26 professional innings, 25 of those at three minor league stops in 2012, Doolittle was called up to the majors on June 5, 2012, against the Texas Rangers pitching one and a third inning while striking out three with all fastballs and none going below 94 mph. He quickly became a key bullpen piece as the top lefty specialist earning his first career save on July 21 against the New York Yankees. He served as a set-up man for A's closer Grant Balfour the rest of the way as Oakland went on to win the AL West on the final day of the season.

Doolittle signed a five-year, $10.5 million extension with the Athletics on April 18, 2014.

Doolittle and righty Luke Gregerson entered the regular season as late-inning setup pitchers for new closer Jim Johnson. However, after an abysmal April, Johnson was removed from the exclusive closing role. Doolittle, Gregerson and Johnson spent the next three weeks pitching under closer by committee. Doolittle was ultimately named A's closer on May 20. Doolittle was one of six A's players named to the 2014 American League All-Star Team; he faced three batters late in the game – striking out two.

Doolittle began the 2015 season on the disabled list due to a shoulder injury.

Sean Doolittle Gnome Day was April 30, 2016. The first 15,000 fans received a Doolittle Gnome which plays a brief Metallica sound, Doolittle's entry music.

While on rehab assignment with the Triple-A Nashville Sounds, Doolittle pitched the seventh inning of a combined no-hitter against the Omaha Storm Chasers on June 7, 2017. Starter Chris Smith pitched the first six innings and was then followed by Doolittle, Tucker Healy, and Simón Castro who each pitched one inning.

Washington Nationals
On July 16, 2017, Doolittle was traded to the Washington Nationals, along with Ryan Madson, for Blake Treinen, Sheldon Neuse, and Jesús Luzardo. On July 18, Doolittle recorded his first save for the Nationals in a 4–3 win over the Los Angeles Angels. In 30 games for the Nationals, he was 1–0 with a 2.40 ERA in 30 innings and was 21-for-22 in save opportunities.

For the 2018 season, he was named closer to begin the season and up until July 11, he was 22-for-23 in save opportunities before falling to the disabled list with a left toe inflammation. He was activated off the disabled list on September 7. 

In 2018, he was 3–3 with 25 saves (7th in the NL) and a 1.60 ERA, as in 43 relief appearances he pitched 45 innings and struck out 60 batters (12.0 per 9 innings). Doolittle was also named to the 2018 National League All-Star team, but he did not pitch in the actual game. He threw a four-seam fastball 88.8% of the time, tops in MLB.

In 2019, he was 6–5 with 29 saves (6th in the NL) and a 4.05 ERA, as in 63 relief appearances he pitched 60 innings and struck out 66 batters. He led the NL in games finished (55), powering his Nationals to a World Series appearance and a save in Game 1. In  innings during the postseason, he gave up only two runs and six hits while striking out eight.

In 2020, Doolittle was plagued by injuries in a season that included two separate stints on the injured list. On August 13, he was placed on the injured list with right knee fatigue after his first five appearances. Shortly after being reinstated, he suffered an oblique strain on September 10 against the Atlanta Braves. That was his final game of 2020 and he ended the season with an 0–2 record and 5.87 ERA across  innings in 11 relief appearances.  He became a free agent after the season.

Cincinnati Reds
On February 8, 2021, Doolittle signed a one-year, $1.5MM contract with the Cincinnati Reds. Doolittle appeared in 45 games for the Reds in 2021, posting a 4.46 ERA with 41 strikeouts. On August 24, 2021, Doolittle was designated for assignment by the Reds.

Seattle Mariners
On August 26, 2021, the Seattle Mariners claimed Doolittle off of waivers. In 11 games with the Mariners, Doolittle pitched 11.1 innings and posted a 4.76 ERA with 12 strikeouts. Doolittle became a free agent upon the conclusion of the season.

Washington Nationals (second stint)
On March 16, 2022, Doolittle signed a one-year contract with the Washington Nationals. He was placed on the injured list on April 20, and underwent UCL internal brace surgery in July, which ended his season. He was re-signed to a minor league contract after the season with an invite to spring training.

Philanthropy 

Doolittle is active off the field with a number of charities and he was recognized for his work in 2016 by being nominated for the Roberto Clemente Award. Doolittle supports Operation Finally Home, a nonprofit dedicated to providing housing for U.S. military veterans and their families, and Swords to Ploughshares, a Bay Area organization devoted to helping veterans with housing and employment. In recognition of his work with U.S. military veterans, he was the Major League Baseball Player recipient of the Bob Feller Act of Valor Award in 2018. In June 2015, when the Oakland Athletics Pride Night received backlash from some fans for the team's support of LGBT rights, Doolittle and then-girlfriend Eireann Dolan bought hundreds of game tickets, which they donated to local LGBT groups, and raised an additional $40,000 in donations. Doolittle is an ally and LGBT rights activist.

In November 2015, Doolittle and Dolan hosted a Thanksgiving dinner in Chicago for 17 Syrian refugee families. In October 2016, he was one of several professional athletes to denounce Republican presidential candidate Donald Trump's comments about non-consensual groping of women as not being "locker room talk." Doolittle identifies as independent politically. In 2019, the Washington Post reported that, because of several actions by the president, he was not going to attend a ceremony at the White House following his team winning the World Series.

Doolittle and Dolan are committed to the District of Columbia statehood movement. In August 2022, they co-hosted an art exhibit in Washington, D.C. entitled "Art Drives Statehood" in order to raise awareness of the cause.

Of his charity work, Doolittle told The New York Times: "When I was a kid, I remember my parents would say, 'Baseball is what you do, but that's not who you are' — like that might be my job, but that's not the end-all, be-all. I feel like I might even be able to use it to help other people or open some doors or explore more opportunities."

Personal life 
Doolittle and Eireann Dolan married on October 2, 2017, eloping the day after the Washington Nationals' last game of the regular season.

While on the road for away games, Doolittle has made it a practice to seek out independent bookstores, and then share his visits on Twitter. Doolittle, an avid reader, particularly of science fiction and fantasy, commented to The Wall Street Journal "I want to support these places that are active in their communities, that are trying to be supportive and inclusive spaces for their communities." In an interview with Librarian of Congress Carla Hayden, Doolittle stated that one of his favorite authors is Octavia E. Butler and in particularly he is a fan of Parable of the Sower.

Doolittle is also a dues-paying member of the Democratic Socialists of America, and has been outspoken about workers' rights throughout baseball.

Sean's brother, Ryan Doolittle, was also a part of the Athletics' farm system at the same time as he was.

Awards
 2018 Bob Feller Act of Valor Award https://www.actofvaloraward.org/bfaov-2018-award-ceremony
 2017 September MLB Reliever of the Month Major_League_Baseball_Reliever_of_the_Month_Award
 2008 California League Mid-Season All-Star
 2008 Arizona Fall League Rising Stars
 2008 Arizona Fall League All-Prospect Team

References

External links

1986 births
Living people
American expatriate baseball players in Canada
American League All-Stars
Arizona League Athletics players
Baseball players from New Jersey
Baseball players from South Dakota
Cincinnati Reds players
Harwich Mariners players
Kane County Cougars players
Major League Baseball pitchers
Midland RockHounds players
Nashville Sounds players
Oakland Athletics players
People from Tabernacle Township, New Jersey
Phoenix Desert Dogs players
Sacramento River Cats players
Seattle Mariners players
Shawnee High School (New Jersey) alumni
Sportspeople from Burlington County, New Jersey
Sportspeople from Rapid City, South Dakota
Stockton Ports players
Vancouver Canadians players
Virginia Cavaliers baseball players
Washington Nationals players
New Jersey Independents
Members of the Democratic Socialists of America
American LGBT rights activists